This is a list of yearly Southwestern Athletic Conference football standings.

SWAC standings

References

Southwestern Athletic Conference
Standings